The Municipality of Kidričevo is a municipality near Ptuj in northeastern Slovenia. The seat of the municipality is the town of Kidričevo. The area is part of the traditional region of Styria. The municipality is now included in the Drava Statistical Region.

Settlements
In addition to the municipal seat of Kidričevo, the municipality also includes the following settlements:

 Apače
 Cirkovce
 Dragonja Vas
 Kungota pri Ptuju
 Lovrenc na Dravskem Polju
 Mihovce
 Njiverce
 Pleterje
 Pongrce
 Šikole
 Spodnje Jablane
 Spodnji Gaj pri Pragerskem
 Starošince
 Stražgonjca
 Strnišče
 Zgornje Jablane
 Župečja Vas

References

External links
 
 Municipality of Kidričevo on Geopedia
 Kidričevo municipal site 

Kidricevo